All Live is a live album by Gordon Lightfoot, It was recorded at the historic Massey Hall. The album was released on April 17, 2012, through Rhino Records. It is a collection of live concert recordings that span 1998 to 2001; all of the recordings are in untouched condition (directly from the mixing board), and span Lightfoot's entire career.

Track listing
All tracks composed by Gordon Lightfoot
"14 Karat Gold"  
"If You Could Read My Mind" 
"Fine as Fine Can Be"   
"Baby Step Back"   
"Early Morning Rain"
"Restless"  
"A Painter Passing Through"
"Rainy Day People" 
"Ringneck Loon"
"Shadows" 
"Sundown"
"Carefree Highway"
"Christian Island"
"The Wreck of the Edmund Fitzgerald"
"Canadian Railroad Trilogy"
"Let It Ride"
"Blackberry Wine"
"Song for a Winter's Night"
"Old Dan's Records"

Personnel
Gordon Lightfoot - vocals, guitar
Michael Heffernan - keyboards
Rick Haynes - bass guitar
Barry Keane - drums, percussion
Terry Clements - guitar

References

2012 albums
Gordon Lightfoot albums
albums recorded at Massey Hall
Rhino Records albums